The 1892 Southern Minnesota tornado was a large and deadly tornado that struck several communities across southern Minnesota on Wednesday, June 15, 1892. The twister was estimated to have been an F5 on the Fujita scale. It killed 12 people in and injured 76 others.

Tornado path
The twister touched down after 3:00 pm in Jackson County in southwestern Minnesota, and after moving east destroyed a schoolhouse near Sherburn in Martin County. The teacher and 16 students were injured, but nobody was killed. The tornado then crossed into Freeborn County before finally lifting back into the clouds in Steele County, just northwest of Bath.

See also
 Climate of Minnesota
 List of F5 and EF5 tornadoes
 List of North American tornadoes and tornado outbreaks

References

External links
 Minnesota Tornado History and Statistics

F5 tornadoes
Tornadoes of 1892
Tornadoes in Minnesota
1892 in Minnesota
1892 natural disasters in the United States
June 1892 events